Honey Buzzard may refer to:

 Pernis (bird), a genus of raptors, consisting of:
 European honey buzzard (Pernis apivorus), a summer migrant to most of Europe and western Asia, wintering in tropical Africa
 Crested honey buzzard (Pernis ptilorhynchus), also known as the Oriental honey buzzard, a summer migrant to Siberia, wintering in tropical south east Asia
 Barred honey buzzard (Pernis celebensis), found in Indonesia and the Philippines
 Henicopernis, a genus of raptors, consisting of:
 Black honey buzzard (Henicopernis infuscatus), endemic to Papua New Guinea
 Long-tailed honey buzzard (Henicopernis longicauda), found in Indonesia and Papua New Guinea
 The Honey Buzzards, a rock band from Norwich, England
 Honeybuzzard, US title of a novel by Angela Carter